Spring Bay is a hamlet in the Canadian province of Saskatchewan.

Demographics 

Government 
Past hamlet board members included:
 Chair - Karen Kramer (Term expired in 2021)
 Secretary - David Price (Term expired in 2019)
 Member - Devin Krohn (Term expired in 2020)

References

Designated places in Saskatchewan
McKillop No. 220, Saskatchewan
Organized hamlets in Saskatchewan
Division No. 6, Saskatchewan